The 1934 South Dakota gubernatorial election was held on November 6, 1934. Incumbent Democratic Governor Tom Berry ran for re-election to a second term. After defeating an intra-party challenge from Lieutenant Governor Hans Ustrud, Berry faced magazine publisher William C. Allen, who won a crowded Republican primary with a large plurality. Aided by the national environment favoring Democrats, Berry won re-election in a landslide.

Democratic Primary

Candidates
 Tom Berry, incumbent Governor
 Hans Ustrud, Lieutenant Governor of South Dakota

Results

Republican Primary

Candidates
 William C. Allen, publisher of the Dakota Farmer
 Otto Kaas, State Senator from Marshall County
 Daniel K. Loucks, former Speaker of the South Dakota House of Representatives
 Charles A. Alseth, State Representative from Kingsbury County

Results

General election

Results

References

South Dakota
1934
Gubernatorial
November 1934 events